Lascoria aon is a species of litter moth of the family Erebidae. It is found in North America.

External links
Images

Herminiinae
Moths described in 1891